Andrena lapponica is a Palearctic species of mining bee.

References

External links
Images representing  Andrena lapponica

Hymenoptera of Europe
lapponica
Insects described in 1838